Larisa Li is a Kazakhstani football midfielder currently playing in the Kazakhstani Championship for BIIK Kazygurt, with which she has also played the Champions League. She is a member of the Kazakhstani national team since 2003.

References

1983 births
Living people
Kazakhstani women's footballers
Kazakhstan women's international footballers
Women's association football midfielders
BIIK Kazygurt players